The Yingling Brothers Auto Company, at 411 S. Main St. in El Dorado, Kansas, was built in 1917.  It was listed on the National Register of Historic Places in 2011.

It is a two-story brick Early Commercial-style building on a concrete foundation.

References

National Register of Historic Places in Butler County, Kansas
Early Commercial architecture in the United States
Buildings and structures completed in 1917